Thelma Ruby, also known as Thelma Ruby-Frye (born 23 March 1925), is a British actress. Born Thelma Wigoder, she grew up in an Orthodox Jewish family in Leeds, England. Her mother, Paula, was an actress; her father was a dentist.

Early life and education
Ruby was educated at Leeds Girls' High School and, after evacuation with her mother to the United States during the Second World War, at Finch College in New York City.

Career
Returning to Britain in 1944, Ruby joined the Entertainments National Service Association and performed to British troops.

In 1958 she acted in Bernard Kops' play, The Hamlet of Stepney Green, at the Lyric Theatre, Hammersmith in London, with  Harold Lang, John Fraser,  John Barrard and George Selway also in the cast. She also had a role in the British film Live Now, Pay Later in 1962. Her West End theatre roles included  performing in Fiddler on the Roof alongside Topol in 1984.

In 1996 she appeared in ITV's Coronation Street as Lily Dempsey, a friend of Phyllis Pearce.

From 1980, she and her husband, Peter Frye, adapted and performed in the play Momma Golda about the life of Golda Meir, Israel's first and only woman Prime Minister. In 2018, at the age of 93, she performed extracts from Momma Golda in a one-woman show at the King's Head Theatre in London.

Personal life
Ruby, who lives in Wimbledon, London and is a member of Wimbledon Synagogue, was married to Canadian-born actor Peter Frye from 1970 until his death in 1991.

Publications
 Ruby-Frye, Thelma; Frye, Peter (1997) Double or Nothing: Two Lives in the Theatre. The Autobiography of Thelma Ruby and Peter Frye''. Janus Publishing Company, 336 pp.

References

External links
 Official website

1925 births
Living people
20th-century English actresses
20th-century English Jews
21st-century English actresses
21st-century English Jews
Actresses from Leeds
British Reform Jews
Entertainers from Yorkshire
Finch College alumni
Jewish English actresses
Jewish entertainers
People educated at Leeds Girls' High School